On January 1, 1969, the Iowa State Highway Commission, now known as the Iowa Department of Transportation, renumbered several state highways.  The changes to the highway system fixed a number of issues: creating continuous route numbers across state lines, removing duplicate route numbers where they were unnecessary, and extending route numbers in some locations.  Twenty-six sections of highway were assigned new route numbers, duplicate route numbers were removed on eleven sections, and one route number was extended to another section.

New routes

Former routes

Existing route changes
{|class="wikitable sortable plainrowheaders"
!scope="col" rowspan=2 | Number
!colspan=2 class=unsortable|Change in length
!scope="col" class="unsortable" rowspan=2 | Southern or western terminus
!scope="col" class="unsortable" rowspan=2 | Northern or eastern terminus
!scope="col" data-sort-type="date" rowspan=2 | Formed
!scope="col" data-sort-type="date" rowspan=2 | Removed
!scope="col" class="unsortable" rowspan=2 | Notes
|-
!scope="col" data-sort-type="number" | mi
!scope="col" data-sort-type="number" | km
|-

Notes

References

See also
List of Iowa state highways

 
 
Highway renumbering, 1969
Highway renumbering in the United States